Cassandra Lee Morris (born April 19, 1982) is an American voice actress. After starting her career as a teenage program host for an educational video series called Real World Science, she worked as a journalist in New York City and Los Angeles writing for local newspapers and programs as well as numerous fashion and style blogs such as About.com, David's Bridal and Patch.com. She got into voice-over starting with Alice and then Yubel in Yu-Gi-Oh! GX and has since worked on a number of animation, anime shows and audiobooks. Her major roles include Ritsu Tainaka in K-On!, Suguha Kirigaya/Leafa in Sword Art Online, Sue in Doraemon, Kyubey in Puella Magi Madoka Magica, Taiga Aisaka in Toradora and Pelops II in Godzilla Singular Point. In video games, she voices Fie Claussell and Alfin Reise Arnor in The Legend of Heroes: Trails of Cold Steel series, Totooria "Totori" Helmold in Atelier Totori: The Adventurer of Arland, Edea Lee in Bravely Default, Lin Lee Koo in Xenoblade Chronicles X, Operator 6O in Nier: Automata, Morgana in the Persona 5 series, and Aoi Asahina and Angie Yonaga in the Danganronpa series.

Biography

Early career
Morris was born in Connecticut and raised in Trumbull. She grew up in an Italian American family. She recalls her first-ever voice-over role as recording for an English as a Second Language learning cassette when she was 12. Her parents would occasionally pull her out of school to take her to auditions in New York City. When she was in middle school at around age 14, she was involved in an educational video series called Real World Science where she served as the on-screen program host as well as provide narration for the science videos being presented. She described her experience as good practice reading scripts, and noted that the producers at Mazzarella Media kept calling her back to do more videos, so she continued working on those through high school and college, where she would later help the company in production and script writing for other educational videos. She got involved in journalism when she wrote for the local newspaper The Trumbull Times where she covered high school sports. She graduated in 2004 from New York University with a Bachelor of Arts degree in Journalism and Mass Communications. In New York, she wrote for US Weekly magazine, New York Press, The Aquarian and Metro New York. She also worked as an associate producer and blogger on Cool in Your Code, a local television show that covered a different New York City zip code every episode. In 2010, she moved to the Los Angeles area, wrote for Patch.com, served as a blog writer and editor in the Prom and Formal Dances at About.com, and wrote blog articles for David's Bridal.

Anime and cartoon voice-overs

While in New York, she got involved in voice acting at 4Kids Entertainment and NYAV Post with English parts in anime dubs. Her first ever anime role was in Magical Doremi, and her first anime television role was with Yu-Gi-Oh! GX where she voiced Alice, and later Yubel, which was her first major anime role. In an interview she said that she would get instructions on how to voice the character based on a brief description and sometimes a picture of the character. Prior to voicing in anime, she was only aware of a few titles such as Dragon Ball Z which her brother liked, and Sailor Moon which her friends liked. She said "It's surreal because I took the original role (in Yu-Gi-Oh) because I liked the character and, of course, as an actor you want to work, but it came with this bonus of all these fans. It's amazing to be part of such a close-knit excited community." She would later voice in Pokémon as well as cartoons such as Winx Club and Chaotic.

Morris would continue voice acting after moving to Los Angeles. In 2011 she got a starring role of Ritsu Tainaka, the drummer and outspoken character in the girl band anime K-On!. She voiced the role of Saki Mikajima in the Durarara!! series which aired on Cartoon Network and which had a sequel in 2015. In 2012, she voiced Kyubey, the mascot character in the magical girl drama Madoka Magica; she says the Kyubey was one of the most controversial anime characters, and made people react strongly. In Sword Art Online, released in 2013, she voices Leafa. The show was broadcast on the Toonami block of Adult Swim, and ran for two seasons. In the romantic comedy Toradora, released in 2014, she voices Taiga Aisaka, the lead heroine who pairs up with a guy in order to court his best friend while he courts Taiga's best friend. She liked playing the tsundere personality of Taiga. The show was one of the first anime to be dubbed and released by NIS America. In 2014, she voiced Sue in Doraemon: Gadget Cat from the Future, the English dub of Doraemon which broadcast on Disney XD.

In the anime film Oblivion Island: Haruka and the Magic Mirror, she voiced Teo, the co-lead to the title character. She also voiced the title character in Patema Inverted, a film where her character discovers a world where everything is upside down and gravity causes her to fall to the ceiling of a room. Other anime film roles include Akiko in Time of Eve, Noriko in Welcome to the Space Show, and Natsuki in Psychic School Wars.

In cartoons, she provided the voice of Lola, one of the three main kids in the cartoon series Angelo Rules which was run on Cartoon Network as well as Netflix. Morris voiced Bubbles in the Netflix cartoon series Popples, based on the toys of the same name. She provided the voice of Frankie Stein in the Monster High reboot film, Welcome to Monster High. She also provided the voice of Diaspro in the sixth season of Winx Club, replacing the singer Ariana Grande, who previously voiced Diaspro in the second one-hour special as well as the third and fifth seasons.

Video game voice-overs

In 2011, she voiced the title character Totooria "Totori" Helmold, an alchemist, in the role-playing video game Atelier Totori: The Adventurer of Arland. Gadget Review, in reviewing the game, said that normally they would ignore the English dub adaptation for a Japanese game, but liked the English voice actors, calling them full of emotion and "always delivering their lines the way you think they should". The reviewer from The Otaku's Study found the English voice-acting for the female characters to be strong, and that she "portrayed the innocent character role effectively." Travis Bruno of Capsule Computers in Australia said that the dub "continues to impress".

In the fantasy role-playing video game Bravely Default she plays main party character Edea Lee, who she describes as a "tiny, spunky, badass warrior." and likened her to herself if she were placed in a medieval setting. She reprised her character in Bravely Second. Jason Hidalgo of Reno Gazette-Journal found the English dub to be hit or miss, but "thoroughly enjoyed Edea’s hilarious 'Mrgrgr' commentary."

In Xenoblade Chronicles X, she voices Lin Lee Koo, one of the main characters in the story. She auditioned and won the role despite the only direction she was originally given was that the video game involved "space travel". Morris sought to preserve Lin's characteristics as strong female figure in her portrayal, describing her as "super smart and very self-reliant... She can cook dinner and also kick your ass."  Morris's take on the character did however include using a deeper, older-sounding voice for Lin, partially to accommodate for the age change, and partially because it was believed that Western audiences would find the high-pitched Japanese version "grating". She voiced between 1,600 and 1,800 lines of dialogue for Lin – above average for a video game. In response to a controversy over Lin's bikini costumes being more covered up in the North American and European versions, Morris said that it bothered her that Lin was only 13 years old, but sees the censorship more as localization and that it would make the game open up to a wider audience.

In Persona 5, she voices Morgana, a shapeshifter character that appears as a cat during the day and guides the main character and his team through the world of shadows. Morgana was described as the mascot character of the game, which meant some "heavy pressure" for Morris as a main character in the series.

In League of Legends, she voices two champions, Nami the Tidecaller and Yuumi the Magical Cat.

Audiobook narration

Morris has narrated a number of audiobooks, a few of which have earned her AudioFile magazine's Earphones Awards, the first was for the young adult novel Dear Zoe by Philip Beard in 2004.  Other Earphone Award-winning titles include Salt to the Sea by Ruta Sepetys, Pip Bartlett's Guide to Magical Creatures by Jackson Pearce, and The Tapper Twins Go To War (With Each Other) by Geoff Rodkey. The audiobook The Elegance of the Hedgehog by Muriel Barbery, where Morris voiced the 12-year-old Paloma, won AudioFile's Best Audiobook of the Year and Publishers Weekly Listen Up Award. Her narration of children's book A Snicker of Magic by Natalie Lloyd received a nomination at the 2015 Audie Awards and received the Honor Recording Odyssey Award from the American Library Association. Morris said that she has worked on many audio books for Simon and Schuster's Books For Young Readers series, where she would record at her studio in Los Angeles and would be patched over by phone line to her producer/director in New York.

Personal life
Morris married songwriter and producer Steve Shebby on February 13, 2016. They live in the Los Angeles area.

Filmography

Anime

Animation

Film

Video games

Live-action

Audio

Notes

References

External links

 
 
 

1982 births
21st-century American actresses
American child actresses
American video game actresses
American voice actresses
Actresses from Connecticut
Actresses from Los Angeles
Actresses from New York City
Living people
New York University alumni
20th-century American actresses
Audiobook narrators
People from Trumbull, Connecticut